Frederico Ricardo (born 18 February 1979 in Portugal) is a Portuguese football manager who last coached GD Bragança in his home country.

Career

Ricardo started his managerial career with FK Senica in the Slovak Super Liga in 2018, a position he held until 2019. After that, he coached GD Bragança.

References

External links 
 Frederico Ricardo: “Since I joined FK Senica, there is a Slovakian behind the bench, wearing our national team's scarf, shouting 'Eusébio'”
 Frederico Ricardo, the 1st Portuguese coach in Slovakia
 Brigantino trainer is the first Portuguese to train in Slovakia 
 We want more Slovak players, FK coach Senica Frederico Ricardo reports before the spring 
 Frederico Ricardo: The Fortuna League is at a high level, we would like to continue in the cup as much as possible

1979 births
Portuguese football managers
Living people
FK Senica managers